Snow cap or snowcap may refer to:

Geography
 Ice cap, a region capped by ice
 Snowfield capping mountains 
 Polar cap capping the poles

Places
 Snowcap Creek, a tributary of the Lillooet River, British Columbia, Canada; see List of tributaries of the Fraser River
 Snow Cap, Großer Arber, Germany; an air operations center radar station of the German Air Force

Fictional locations
 Snowcap Base, a fictional location in the Whoniverse, from the Doctor Who serial The Tenth Planet

Biology
 SNO-Cap (S-Nitrosocaptopril), a nitrovasodilator
 Snowcap, a large white area of coloration in horses from the coat patterns of the leopard complex
 snow-capped manakin (Lepidothrix nattereri), a bird
 snowcap (Microchera albocoronata), a hummingbird
 Snowcap, a Sativa-dominant hybrid strain of marijuana, see List of names for cannabis strains

Products
 Sno-Caps, a brand of candy
 SnowCaps (Glutathione), a skin whitening product containing glutathione

Businesses and companies
 SNOCAP, a content control technology company
 MHS Aviation (Germany) (ICAO airline code: MHV; IATA airline code: M2; callsign: SNOWCAP) German charter airline
 Snowcap Inn, Newry, Maine, USA; a hotel at the Sunday River (ski resort)

Other uses
 Operation Snowcap (1987-1994) a U.S. counter-narcotics trafficking program 
 Snowcaps (song), a 1999 song by Unwed Sailor
 Snow Cap (story) by Matthew S. Armstrong from the graphic novel anthology Flight, see List of volumes of Flight

See also

 Frost line (disambiguation)
 Snow Peak (disambiguation)
 Icecap (disambiguation)
 Snow (disambiguation)
 Cap (disambiguation)